Ben McGlynn (born 6 August 1985) is an Australian rules football coach and former player who played with the Hawthorn Football Club and Sydney Swans in the Australian Football League. He is currently an assistant coach at the St Kilda Football Club.

AFL career

Recruitment
A small onballer, McGlynn was picked late by Hawthorn in the 2006 rookie draft after impressing at the Box Hill Hawks the VFL affiliated club with the Hawks. Originally from Dareton, New South Wales, he played for the Bendigo Pioneers in the TAC Cup.

McGlynn excelled for Box Hill at VFL level and is a centre clearance specialist who will only improve as he builds his fitness to AFL standards.

Hawthorn (2006–2009)
During the 2006 season McGlynn made his debut against the Bulldogs in round 10, in which he kicked a goal. He continued to play three more at senior level and did OK as a small forward. He was promoted to the seniors list at the end of the 2006 season. In 14 games for Box Hill during the 2006 season he featured in the best players eight times.

In 2007 McGlynn played 21 games for Hawthorn after injured skipper Richie Vandenberg left an opening in the midfield.

Sydney (2010–2016)
McGlynn and Josh Kennedy were traded to the Sydney Swans at the end of the 2009 season. His transfer has appeared to have immediate dividends with McGlynn booting a career-best 5 goal haul against the Adelaide Crows in his second game for the Swans. McGlynn unfortunately missed many games due to various injuries, including a quad injury and a cheek fracture sustained in a brutal collision with Zac Clarke of Fremantle at Subiaco Oval. When he played however he was one of the most consistent players for the side, playing through the forward line and providing quality defensive pressure and goal kicking ability.

McGlynn's 2011 season was book-ended by very consistent play in different roles. He started in the same role he played for much of 2010, a small forward. Here he kicked goals often and was the leading Swans' goal kicker at the halfway point of the year. So dangerous was he becoming that opposition sides started to tag him more heavily and as such, McGlynn's output through the middle of the year dropped. Coach John Longmire consequently moved him into the midfield to play as a tagger (a role which he played during his time in Hawthorn) and McGlynn's performances improved markedly. His performance in the Swans' massive upset win over Geelong at Skilled Stadium was particularly noteworthy as he not only limited the influence of star Cat midfielder Joel Selwood but also led the clearance count and had over 20 possessions in a near BOG performance. McGlynn's year was rewarded with a 9th-place finish in the 2011 Bob Skilton Medal.

McGlynn missed out on playing in the Swans' 2012 AFL Grand Final victory due to a hamstring injury sustained in week one of the finals. He had been very consistent for Sydney across half forward and in the midfield to that point in the year.

At the conclusion of the 2016 season after playing in the losing grand final, he announced his retirement from the AFL.

Statistics

|- style=background:#EAEAEA
| 2006 ||  || 43
| 4 || 2 || 1 || 48 || 24 || 72 || 26 || 11 || 0.5 || 0.3 || 12.0 || 6.0 || 18.0 || 6.5 || 2.8 || 0
|-
| 2007 ||  || 22
| 21 || 15 || 11 || 230 || 121 || 351 || 142 || 50 || 0.7 || 0.5 || 11.0 || 5.8 || 16.7 || 6.8 || 2.4 || 3
|- style=background:#EAEAEA
| 2008 ||  || 21
| 3 || 2 || 1 || 32 || 18 || 50 || 22 || 8 || 0.7 || 0.3 || 10.7 || 6.0 || 16.7 || 7.3 || 2.7 || 0
|-
| 2009 ||  || 21
| 16 || 9 || 16 || 170 || 128 || 298 || 92 || 61 || 0.6 || 1.0 || 10.6 || 8.0 || 18.6 || 5.8 || 3.8 || 1
|- style=background:#EAEAEA
| 2010 ||  || 21
| 14 || 23 || 13 || 147 || 99 || 246 || 78 || 45 || 1.6 || 0.9 || 10.5 || 7.1 || 17.6 || 5.6 || 3.2 || 8
|-
| 2011 ||  || 21
| 24 || 30 || 24 || 235 || 135 || 370 || 85 || 114 || 1.3 || 1.0 || 9.8 || 5.6 || 15.4 || 3.5 || 4.8 || 6
|- style=background:#EAEAEA
| 2012 ||  || 21
| 22 || 30 || 24 || 206 || 119 || 325 || 80 || 73 || 1.4 || 1.1 || 9.4 || 5.4 || 14.8 || 3.6 || 3.3 || 2
|-
| 2013 ||  || 21
| 21 || 30 || 16 || 191 || 88 || 279 || 62 || 87 || 1.4 || 0.8 || 9.1 || 4.2 || 13.3 || 3.0 || 4.1 || 0
|- style=background:#EAEAEA
| 2014 ||  || 21
| 19 || 24 || 16 || 233 || 151 || 384 || 83 || 121 || 1.3 || 0.8 || 12.3 || 7.9 || 20.2 || 4.4 || 6.4 || 12
|-
| 2015 ||  || 21
| 9 || 6 || 6 || 83 || 52 || 135 || 45 || 42 || 0.7 || 0.7 || 9.2 || 5.8 || 15.0 || 5.0 || 4.7 || 0
|- style=background:#EAEAEA
| 2016 ||  || 21
| 18 || 24 || 11 || 157 || 88 || 245 || 66 || 79 || 1.3 || 0.6 || 8.7 || 4.9 || 13.6 || 3.7 || 4.4 || 1
|- class="sortbottom"
! colspan=3| Career
! 171 !! 195 !! 139 !! 1732 !! 1023 !! 2755 !! 781 !! 691 !! 1.1 !! 0.8 !! 10.1 !! 6.0 !! 16.1 !! 4.6 !! 4.0 !! 33
|}

Honours and achievements
Team
 2× Minor premiership: 2014, 2016

Individual
 Australia international rules football team: 2011
 Box Hill Hawks All-Stars team (1999–2019)

Post-playing career
Following his retirement, Ben joined St Kilda as an assistant coach in October 2016.

References

External links

.

Australian rules footballers from New South Wales
Hawthorn Football Club players
Sydney Swans players
Box Hill Football Club players
1985 births
Living people
Bendigo Pioneers players
Australian people of Irish descent
Australia international rules football team players